The Hansa-Brandenburg GW was a floatplane torpedo bomber produced in Germany during World War I for the Imperial German Navy. In configuration, it was similar to the Hansa-Brandenburg G.I land-based bomber, but the GW was substantially larger and heavier. Like the G.I, it was a conventional three-bay biplane design with staggered wings with the lower wing of slightly greater span than the upper. The undercarriage consisted of twin pontoons, each mounted on a separate truss structure, leaving space between them for a single torpedo to be dropped from the underside of the fuselage. The metal trusses that had attached the engines to the sides of the G.I's fuselage were not present in this design, with the engine nacelles carried on struts in the interplane gap.

Specifications (variant)

References

Further reading
  

1910s German bomber aircraft
GW
Floatplanes
Biplanes
Twin piston-engined tractor aircraft
Aircraft first flown in 1916